Pocadius is a genus of sap-feeding beetles in the family Nitidulidae. There are about nine described species in Pocadius.

Species
These nine species belong to the genus Pocadius:

 Pocadius adustus Reitter, 1888 g
 Pocadius basalis Schaeffer, 1911 i c g
 Pocadius centralis Cline, 2008 i c g
 Pocadius ferrugineus (Fabricius, 1775) g
 Pocadius fulvipennis Erichson, 1843 i c g b
 Pocadius helvolus Erichson, 1843 i c g b (hairy puffball beetle)
 Pocadius luisalfredoi Cline, 2008 i c g
 Pocadius niger Parsons, 1936 i c g
 Pocadius tepicensis Cline, 2008 i c g
Data sources: i = ITIS, c = Catalogue of Life, g = GBIF, b = Bugguide.net

References

Further reading

External links

 

Nitidulidae
Articles created by Qbugbot